North Carolina's 118th House district is one of 120 districts in the North Carolina House of Representatives. It has been represented by Republican Mark Pless since 2021.

Geography
Since 2023, the district has included all of Madison and Haywood counties . The district overlaps with the 47th and 50th Senate districts.

District officeholders since 2003

Election results

2022

2020

2018

2016

2014

2012

2010

2008

2006

2004

2002

References

North Carolina House districts
Madison County, North Carolina
Haywood County, North Carolina